Platanthera michaelii is an uncommon species of orchid known by the common names Michael's rein orchid and Michael's piperia. It is endemic to California, where it is known from the coastal plains, hills, and mountains, and the Sierra Nevada foothills. It can be found in varied habitat, including scrub, woodland, and forest. This orchid grows erect to about 70 centimeters in maximum height from a bulbous caudex. The basal leaves are up to 24 centimeters long by 5 wide. Leaves higher on the stem are much reduced. The upper part of the stem is a spikelike inflorescence of many yellow-green flowers which are fragrant in the evenings.

References

External links 

 Jepson Manual Treatment
 USDA Plants Profile
 Flora of North America
 Piperia michaelii — U.C.Photo gallery

michaelii
Endemic flora of California
Orchids of California
Flora of the Sierra Nevada (United States)
Natural history of the California chaparral and woodlands
Natural history of the Channel Islands of California
Natural history of the San Francisco Bay Area
Natural history of the Santa Monica Mountains
Natural history of the Transverse Ranges
Endemic orchids of the United States
Flora without expected TNC conservation status